Chung Hyeon was the defending champion and successfully defended his title after defeating Lee Duck-hee 6–4, 6–2 in the final.

Seeds

Draw

Finals

Top half

Bottom half

References
Main Draw
Qualifying Draw

OEC Kaohsiung - Singles